Niknafs is a family name. Notable people with the name include:

 Hassan Niknafs, Iranian Azerbaijani mechanical engineer and academic administrator
 Yashar Niknafs, American scientist and businessperson
 Ziaeddin Niknafs (born 1986), Iranian football defender
 Zobeir Niknafs (born 1993),  Iranian football midfielder